Black Joy is a 1977 British film directed by Anthony Simmons. The story of an immigrant country boy in Brixton, London. It was entered into the 1977 Cannes Film Festival.

The film is a lightly ironic, British culture-clash comedy. Trevor Thomas stars as a Guyanese youth who is under the delusion that life will be easier for him in London. No sooner does Thomas set foot in England than he gets tangled up in one disaster after another. The catalyst for most of Our Hero's travails is "assimilated" Caribbean Norman Beaton, who plays a streetwise con artist.

The film was adapted from Dark Days and Light Nights, a stage play by Jamal Ali, who also wrote the screenplay.

Plot
In London in the late 1970s, Guyanese immigrant Ben Jones arrives at Heathrow Airport with a suitcase and a wallet full of money. Immigration officials refuse to believe his naïve explanation that the cash was given by his grandmother, and strip-search him. Humiliated and confused, Ben travels to Brixton in search of an obscure address. A ten-year-old boy, Devon, spots him and offers to help find the address if Ben pays him. When Ben foolishly reveals his fat wallet, Devon runs off with it, and Ben is forced to sleep at the local hostel. Dave King, a charismatic petty crook and lover of Devon's mother Miriam, pretends to be a responsible adult and intercepts Ben's wallet, but he keeps the money knowing that Devon has stolen it. That evening, Dave tries to seduce Miriam but she resists him, explaining that she has recently become pregnant. An argument ensues and Miriam forces Dave to leave.

Ben almost loses his suitcase at the hostel, but defends himself against the thief. In an attempt to find his missing wallet he follows Devon around Brixton, but is sidetracked by Devon's beautiful aunt Saffra. At Miriam's café, Ben confronts Devon about the stolen wallet but Dave intercedes and calms the situation, hiding Devon's guilt and befriending Ben by loaning him some money. Unaware that Dave's cash comes from his own stolen wallet, Ben accompanies Dave to a betting shop and defends him in a brawl. They place a bet on a horse that wins and Ben puts his winnings towards new accommodation. He finds a job as a dustman but loses it all again when he gives his earnings to a fraudulent landlord. Desperate for somewhere to stay, Ben appeals to Dave to share a flat. Once he realises that Ben now has a steady income Dave agrees to the flat-share and imposes a set of slanted rules that Ben is too naïve to reject.

Ben uses his new income to decorate the flat and tries to impress Saffra. He gives her a family heirloom – a ring – but Saffra returns it because it is financially worthless. Dave realises that Ben is still a virgin and arranges a trip to Soho where they visit sex shops, strip clubs and a prostitute. At a nightclub Ben meets Sally, a white woman who seduces him, and that night he loses his virginity.

Dave loses all his money in a poker game and goes to Miriam. She is furious and upset, having just returned from an abortion clinic. Dave is hurt that the unborn child has been aborted without his knowledge but this serves to anger Miriam more. With encouragement from Sally, Ben confronts Dave about the degree to which he has abused their friendship. Dave implies that Ben's naivety was as much to blame for his being duped as Dave's own immoral behaviour. Ben, now wiser, agrees to remain friends.

In a bid to cement his relationship with Miriam and Ben, Dave takes advantage of a car deal arranged by Jomo, a loan shark and sometime boyfriend of Saffra. Taking Jomo's new Buick and money, he drives Miriam, Ben and Saffra to Margate for an overnight trip. The four spend a lot of money and Dave loses the rest at a casino. Ben and Saffra sleep together but Saffra remains non-committal. In the morning Dave approaches Ben for some cash to pay the bills he cannot afford. Ben refuses, but suggests that he buys Jomo's car and insists on a receipt. Dave reluctantly agrees and the group return to London.

Once in Brixton, Ben refuses to resell the Buick, putting Dave in a dangerous position with Jomo. Jomo tries to force the sale but is overpowered by Ben who makes it clear he will not be bullied. Jomo backs down and Dave is thankful. Devon and Saffra join Ben in the Buick and they drive away.

Cast
 Norman Beaton as Dave King
 Trevor Thomas as Ben Jones
 Floella Benjamin as Miriam
 Dawn Hope as Saffra
 Oscar James as Jomo
 Paul J. Medford as Devon
 Vivian Stanshall as the Warden

Soundtrack
The soundtrack album contains hits by a number of Soul/R&B stars from the 1960s and '70s:

 Jimmy Helms – "Black Joy"
 Labelle – "Lady Marmalade"
 Moments & Whatnauts – "Girls"
 The Drifters – "Saturday Night At The Movies"
 Johnny Nash – "Tears On My Pillow"
 Shirley & Company – "Shame, Shame, Shame"
 The Real Thing – "Dance With Me"
 The Three Degrees – "When Will I See You Again"
 The Cimarons – "Living On The Dole"
 Billy Paul – "Me & Mrs. Jones"
 Spinners – "The Rubber Band Man"
 Harold Melvin & the Blue Notes – "Don't Leave Me This Way"
 Gladys Knight & The Pips – "Midnight Train To Georgia"
 The O'Jays – "Darlin' Darlin' Baby"
 Biddu Orchestra – "Summer Of '42"
 The Real Thing – "Lightning Strikes Again"
 Aretha Franklin – "I Say A Little Prayer"
 Bill Fredericks – "Love With You"
 Ben E. King – "Stand By Me"
 Lee Vanderbilt – "Lonely I"
 Linda Lewis – "It's In His Kiss"
 The Cimarons – "Black Joy"

References

External links

1977 films
British comedy films
Blaxploitation films
Black British mass media
Black British cinema
Black British films
Hood comedy films
1970s English-language films
1977 comedy films
Films directed by Anthony Simmons
British films based on plays
Films set in London
Films produced by Elliott Kastner
Films about immigration to Europe
Films produced by Arnon Milchan
1970s American films
1970s British films